Paracroton zeylanicus is a species of flowering plant in the family Euphorbiaceae that is endemic to south-western parts of Sri Lanka. It was first found from a Hinidumkanda Biosphere Reserve, but rapidly declined due to deforestation and other anthropogenic activities. The plant is listed as a critically endangered by IUCN.

References

Crotoneae
Endemic flora of Sri Lanka
Taxonomy articles created by Polbot
Plants described in 1864
Taxobox binomials not recognized by IUCN